Melvin Frederick Nelson (born May 30, 1936) is a retired American professional baseball player and scout. A left-handed pitcher, the native of San Diego, California, appeared in 93 games, 82 in relief, over six seasons in Major League Baseball for the St. Louis Cardinals, Los Angeles Angels and Minnesota Twins.

Nelson's 15-year playing career included the entire  season and parts of five others in the Major Leagues.  In 1965, he appeared in 28 games and 54 innings pitched for the American League champion Twins and was winless in four decisions with three saves. However, he did not pitch in the 1965 World Series.  Three years later, in his second stint with the Cardinals, Nelson—recalled from the minor leagues in midyear—contributed two wins to the Redbirds'  pennant-winning season, both as a starting pitcher. He then appeared in the 1968 World Series in a "mop-up" role in Game 6, hurling a scoreless ninth inning in a game won by the opposing Detroit Tigers, 13–1.

During his big-league career, Nelson allowed 184 hits and 69 bases on balls in 173 innings pitched, recording 98 strikeouts and five saves. He handled 40 total chances (7 putouts, 33 assists) without an error for a perfect 1.000 fielding percentage.  

After retiring from the field, Nelson then scouted for the Cardinals and other MLB clubs.

References

External links
, or Retrosheet
Venezuelan Professional Baseball League statistics

1936 births
Atlanta Crackers players
Baseball players from San Diego
Billings Mustangs players
Chicago White Sox scouts
Colorado Rockies scouts
Columbus Foxes players
Denver Bears players
Estrellas Orientales (VPBL) players
Florida Instructional League Twins players
Fresno Cardinals players
Hawaii Islanders players
Houston Astros scouts
Houston Buffaloes players
Living people
Jacksonville Suns players
Los Angeles Angels players
Los Angeles Dodgers scouts
Major League Baseball pitchers
Minnesota Twins players
Oakland Athletics scouts
Omaha Cardinals players
Portland Beavers players
Richmond Braves players
Rochester Red Wings players
St. Louis Cardinals players
St. Louis Cardinals scouts
Spokane Indians players
Tulsa Oilers (baseball) players
York White Roses players